Glasgow and Aberdeen Universities, in Scotland, was a university constituency represented in the House of Commons of the Parliament of the United Kingdom from 1868 until 1918. It was merged with the Edinburgh and St Andrews Universities constituency to form the Combined Scottish Universities constituency.

Members of Parliament

Election results

Elections in the 1910s

Elections in the 1900s

Elections in the 1890s

Elections in the 1880s

Elections in the 1870s

 Caused by Gordon's appointment as a Lord of Appeal, becoming Lord Gordon of Drumearn.

 Caused by Gordon's appointment as Lord Advocate.

Elections in the 1860s

 Caused by Moncreiff's appointment as Lord Justice Clerk and elevation to the peerage, becoming Lord Moncreiff.

References 

Historic parliamentary constituencies in Scotland (Westminster)
Politics of Aberdeen
Politics of Glasgow
Constituencies of the Parliament of the United Kingdom disestablished in 1918
Constituencies of the Parliament of the United Kingdom established in 1868
University constituencies of the Parliament of the United Kingdom
University of Aberdeen
University of Glasgow